The 1927 Macdonald Brier Tankard, the Canadian men's national curling championship, was held March 1–3 at the Granite Club in Toronto. This edition of the Brier would be the first, with it also being the first time it was hosted in Ontario, and the first time it was hosted in Toronto's Granite Club.

Skip Murray MacNeill, skip of the Nova Scotia champion Halifax rink would win the inaugural tournament, leading his rink of skips (his original team couldn't make the trip) to victory.

The event began with an opening banquet with Ontario Lieutenant Governor William Donald Ross and Ontario Premier Howard Ferguson welcoming players.<ref>Weeks, Bob; The Brier, pg 32</ref>

Event summary
After successful trips by the winner of the Manitoba Bonspiel in 1925 and their participation in the Quebec Bonspiel being deemed popular enough to consider a national tournament in 1926, the Stewart brothers of Macdonald Tobacco would sponsor what would become the Brier in 1927. Played at the Granite Club in Toronto, the tournament would feature teams from four provinces, two cities, and a representative from Western Canada and Northern Ontario, the latter becoming a fixture at the Brier. It would be the only Brier that would have all games go 14 ends (with two games going to a 15th end to break ties)

Teams
The teams are listed as follows:

Round Robin standings

Round Robin results

Draw 1Tuesday, March 1 (Morning)Draw 2Tuesday, March 1 (afternoon)Draw 3Wednesday, March 2 (morning)Draw 4Wednesday, March 2 (afternoon)Draw 5Wednesday, March 2 (evening)Draw 6Thursday, March 3 (morning) 

Draw 7Thursday, March 3 (afternoon)''

Team selection
Teams were chosen by invitation. Many provinces had yet to have provincial championships.

Western Canada: Winners of the "Macdonald Brier event" playoff between Manitoba and Saskatchewan.
Nova Scotia: "Four best players (in the province)." Macneill was chosen as winner of the Johnson Cup.
Montreal: Amalgamation rink, selected by the Granite Association of Montreal
Northern Ontario: Winners of the Grand Aggregate of the Northern Curling Association bonspiel
Ontario: A selection of the winners of the Ontario Tankard
Toronto: Winners of the Canada Life trophy.
Quebec: Winners of the Quebec Bonspiel.
New Brunswick: Selected by the New Brunswick Curling Association.

Notes

References

Macdonald Brier, 1927
Macdonald Brier, 1927
The Brier
Curling in Toronto
Macdonald Brier
Macdonald Brier
1920s in Toronto